A Place We Knew is the debut studio album by Australian singer and songwriter Dean Lewis. The album was released on 22 March 2019. The album was announced in February 2019, with Lewis revealing that "all the songs were written through relationships I'd been in and houses I used to live in and hotel rooms".

Of the album, Dean stated that "Things come and go so fast, but I wanted to make something authentic, raw", describing the title as "encapsulat(ing) the bittersweet memories of past relationships".

The album topped the Australian chart upon release. It will be supported by a US and European tour from February to April 2019, as well as a five-date Australia and New Zealand tour in May 2019. During his musical guest appearance on Jimmy Kimmel Live! on 18 March 2019, Lewis performed "7 Minutes" and "Stay Awake" to support the release of the album.

At the ARIA Music Awards of 2019, the album was nominated for three awards, winning Album of the Year and Best Male Artist. and Song of the Year for "7 Minutes".

Singles
"Be Alright" is the album's lead single, released on 29 June 2018 and peaked at number 1 in Australia and won an ARIA Music Award at the ARIA Music Awards of 2018. "7 Minutes" was released on 18 January 2019 as the album's second single and peaked at number 10 in Australia. "Stay Awake" released on 19 March 2019 as the album's third single. "Straight Back Down" was released to radio on 30 August 2019 as the album's fourth single.

The album includes the singles "Waves" and "Chemicals" from Lewis' 2017 extended play Same Kind of Different.

Critical reception

All Music's critic Neil Z. Yeung gave A Place We Knew an overall positive review, commending the lyrics, saying it shows "simple yet evocative storytelling, resulting in painfully relatable snapshots of times when things just don't work out". Cameron Adams from Herald Sun gave the album 3.5 out of 5 stars saying "Vance Joy, and before him Ed Sheeran and The Lumineers, [have] set the sonic blueprint for Lewis' who is 'seizing the moment' for super-ultra-non-toxic masculinity in music." Suggesting to try this album if you like Joy and Sheeran".
 
Gavin Scott from Who Magazine gave the album 5 out of 5 stars saying "Thanks to both the deeply personal nature of Lewis' lyrics, inspired by his own real-life relationships, and the pain and emotion that comes through in his vocals, it's impossible not to feel moved by A Place We Knew. A substantial, meaningful album for a world too often distracted by frivolity."
 
Jeff Jenkins from Stack Magazine said "His break-up balladry – emotive, anthemic and folk-tinged – falls somewhere between Ed Sheeran and Sheppard. It's a potent formula". Brodie Lancaster from The Saturday Paper said "The appeal of Dean Lewis's debut album is that the earnest musings on broken relationships can be moulded to anyone's story. But what his formulaic songwriting gains in popularity, it lacks in depth and insight".

Track listing

Charts

Weekly charts

Year-end charts

Certifications

Release history

References

2019 debut albums
Dean Lewis albums
Island Records albums
ARIA Award-winning albums